Jeju Island (Jeju: 제주도;) is South Korea's largest island, covering an area of , which is 1.83 percent of the total area of the country. It is also the most populous island in South Korea; at the end of September 2020, the total resident registration population of Jeju Province is 672,948, of which 4,000 reside on outlying islands such as the Chuja Islands and Udo Island.

The island lies in the Korea Strait, south of the Korean Peninsula, and South Jeolla Province. Jeju is the only self-governing province in South Korea, meaning that the province is run by local inhabitants instead of politicians from the mainland.

The northern end of Jeju Island is Kimnyeong Beach, the southern end is Songak Mountain, the western end is Suwolbong, and the eastern end is Seongsan Ilchulbong.

The island was formed by the eruption of an underwater volcano approximately 2 million years ago.  It contains a natural World Heritage Site, the Jeju Volcanic Island and Lava Tubes. Jeju Island has a temperate climate which is moderate; even in winter, the temperature rarely falls below . Jeju is a popular holiday destination and a sizable portion of the economy relies on tourism and related economic activity.

Etymology
 
Historically, the island has been called by many different names including:
 Doi (hanja: , literally "Island barbarian")
 Dongyeongju (hanja: 東瀛州)
 Juho
 Tammora (탐모라, 耽牟羅)
 Seomna (섭라, 涉羅)
 Tangna (탁라, 乇羅)
 Tamna (탐라, 耽羅)
 Quelpart, Quelparte or Quelpaert Island
 Junweonhado (준원하도, 준원下島 meaning "southern part of peninsula")
 Taekseungnido (meaning "the peaceful hot island in Joseon")
 Samdado (meaning "Island of Three Abundances")

Before the Japanese annexation in 1910, the island was usually known as Quelpart (Quelpaërt, Quelpaert) to Europeans; during the occupation it was known by the Japanese name Saishū. The name Quelpart coming from French language is attested in Dutch no later than 1648 and may have denoted the first Dutch ship to spot the island, the quelpaert de Brack around 1642, or rather some visual similarity of the island from some angle to this class of ships (a small dispatch vessel, also called a galiot).

The first European explorers to sight the island, the Portuguese, called it Ilha de Ladrones (Island of Thieves).

The name "Fungma island" appeared in the "Atlas of China" of M. Martini who arrived in China as a missionary in 1655.

Landscape

The island formed by volcanic eruptions approximately two million years ago, during the Pleistocene epoch. The island consists chiefly of basalt and lava.

An area covering about 12% of Jejudo is known as Gotjawal Forest. This area remained uncultivated until the 21st century, as its base of 'a'a lava made it difficult to develop for agriculture. Because this forest remained pristine for so long, it has a unique ecology.

The forest is the main source of groundwater and thus the main water source for the half million people of the island, because rainwater penetrates directly into the aquifer through the cracks of the 'a'a lava under the forest. Gotjawal forest is considered an internationally important wetland under the Ramsar Convention by some researchers because it is the habitat of unique species of plants and is the main source of water for the residents, although to date it has not been declared a Ramsar site.

Formation
About 2 million years ago, the island of Jeju was formed through volcanic activity.
About 1.2 million years ago, a magma chamber formed under the sea floor and began to erupt.
About 700 thousand years ago, the island had been formed through volcanic activity. Volcanic activity then stopped for approximately 100 thousand years.
About 300 thousand years ago, volcanic activity restarted along the coastline.
About 100 thousand years ago, volcanic activity formed Halla Mountain. 
About 25 thousand years ago, lateral eruptions around Halla Mountain left multiple oreum (smaller 'parasitic' cones on the flanks of the primary cone). 
Volcanic activity stopped and prolonged weathering and erosion helped shape the island.

Climate
Jeju has a humid subtropical climate (Cfa in the Köppen climate classification). Four distinct seasons are experienced on Jeju; winters are cool with moderate rainfall, while summers are hot and humid with very high rainfall.

In January 2016, a cold wave affected the region. Snow and frigid weather forced the cancellation of 1,200 flights on Jejudo, stranding approximately 90,300 passengers.

See also
 Jeju black cattle, indigenous cattle breed
 Jeju horse, indigenous horse breed
 Jeju Volcanic Island and Lava Tubes

References

External links 

 Jeju Volcanic Island and Lava Tubes World Heritage site on Google Arts and Culture
 

Biosphere reserves of South Korea
Islands of Jeju Province
Islands of the East China Sea
Islands of the Sea of Japan
Islands of the Yellow Sea
World Heritage Sites in South Korea